Harry Conrad Gahn (April 26, 1880 – November 2, 1962) was a U.S. Representative from Ohio for one term from 1921 to 1923.

Life and career
Born in Elmore, Ohio, Gahn attended the public schools.
He taught school three years.
He was graduated from the law department of the University of Michigan at Ann Arbor in 1904.
He was admitted to the bar and commenced practice in Cleveland, Ohio.
Attorney for the Cleveland Legal Aid Society 1909-1911.
He served as member of the city council 1910-1921, serving as its president in 1918 and 1919.
He served as member of the Cleveland River and Harbor Commission 1911-1921.
Treasurer of the American Association of Port Authorities 1912-1919.
He was in charge of Liberty Loan campaigns in his district during the First World War.

Gahn was elected as a Republican to the Sixty-seventh Congress (March 4, 1921 – March 3, 1923).
He was an unsuccessful candidate for reelection in 1922 to the Sixty-eighth Congress and for election in 1936 to the Seventy-fifth Congress.
He resumed the practice of his profession.
He served as solicitor for Independence, Ohio from 1936 to 1956.
He died in Cleveland, Ohio, November 2, 1962.
He was interred in the Harris-Elmore Union Cemetery, Elmore, Ottawa County, Ohio.

Gahn was a member of the Masons and Knights of Pythias.

Sources

1880 births
1962 deaths
Cleveland City Council members
People from Ottawa County, Ohio
Lawyers from Cleveland
Ohio lawyers
University of Michigan Law School alumni
20th-century American politicians
People from Elmore, Ohio
20th-century American lawyers
Republican Party members of the United States House of Representatives from Ohio